Takaanui Hōhaia Tarakawa (1852 – 11 December 1919) was a notable New Zealand  tohunga, historian, genealogist, and writer. Of Māori descent, he identified with the Ngāi Te Rangi, Ngāti Rangiwewehi, Tapuika and Te Arawa iwi and lived much of his life in the Bay of Plenty.

He was born in  1852 and grew up to be an expert in Māori lore, tradition and history. From the 1880s he was involved in dealings in the Native Land Court. He published papers in the Journal of the Polynesian Society, collaborating with S. Percy Smith.

References

1852 births
1919 deaths
20th-century New Zealand historians
New Zealand genealogists
New Zealand Māori writers
Ngāi Te Rangi people
Tohunga
Ngāti Rangiwewehi people
Te Arawa people
19th-century New Zealand historians